Dwarf iris is a common name for several plants and may refer to:

Iris danfordiae
Iris pumila
Iris reticulata, native to Russia, the Caucasus, and northern Iran
Iris verna, endemic to the Eastern United States
Iris lacustris, native to the Great Lakes region